Edmund Filmer may refer to:

 Sir Edmund Filmer, 8th Baronet (1809–1857), Member of Parliament (MP) for West Kent 1838–1857
 Sir Edmund Filmer, 9th Baronet (1835–1886), MP for West Kent 1859–1865 and Mid Kent 1880–1884
Sir Edmund Filmer, 6th Baronet (1727–1834), of the Filmer baronets

See also
Edward Filmer, English dramatist